Tithraustes lambertae is a moth of the family Notodontidae. It occurs in wet forests on the Caribbean slope in Costa Rica.

The length of the forewings is 16-17.5 mm for males and 16.5–18 mm for females. The ground color of the forewings is gray to dark gray, with some tinges of gray-brown. The basal third is semihyaline, with gray veins as they pass through. The ground color of the hindwings is gray and generally darker than the forewings. The central area of the wing is semihyaline from the base and the veins are gray as they pass through.

Larvae have been recorded feeding on six species of palm: Asterogyne martiana, Calyptrogyne trichostachys, Geonoma congesta, Geonoma cuneata, Prestoea decurrens and Welfia regia.

Etymology
The species is named in honor of Anne Lambert, a Canadian who provided support for protection of Area de Conservacion Guanacaste rainforest, where Tithraustes lambertae lives.

References
  2009: Generic revision of the Dioptinae (Lepidoptera: Noctuoidea: Notodontidae) Part 1: Dioptini. Bulletin of the American Museum of Natural History, 321: 1-674.

Moths described in 2008
Notodontidae